The Matriarch (Finnish: Lieksa!) is a 2007 Finnish comedy-drama film written, directed and edited by Markku Pölönen and produced by the Pölönen-owned film production company Suomen Filmiteollisuus.

Plot
Martta (Sanna-Kaisa Palo) and Otto (Heikki Kinnunen) are a pair of traveling tailors who claim to be bastard descendants of the Romanovs and wander from town to town in Finland seeking work, accompanied by their two half-witted adult sons, Hippo (Tuomas Uusitalo), Repe (Tatu Siivonen) and equally silly son-in-law Ventti (Toni Wahlström). The family occasionally turns to crime when they can't quite make ends meet, and the boys begin turning to violence with greater frequency when Otto weakens and Martta becomes the head of the family business. Their fortunes take an unexpected turn when the brothers assault and abduct a man they call Kasper (Samuli Vauramo), who becomes the family's sidekick in their travels. Despite Kasper's inability to speak, he attracts Martta's youngest daughter, an attractive young woman named Lara (Jenni Banerjee), but the family is in disarray when a long-lost half-brother, Laszlo (Peter Franzén), suddenly re-emerges and tries to wrest control of the clan away from his mother.

Cast

 Peter Franzén - Laszlo
 Sanna-Kaisa Palo - Martta
 Samuli Vauramo - Kasper
 Jenni Banerjee - Lara
 Heikki Kinnunen - Niccolo/Otto
 Toni Wahlström - Ventti
 Lotta Lehtikari - Veera
 Elina Knihtilä - Roosa
 Puntti Valtonen - Jori
 Janne Reinikainen - Lutku
 Heikki Hela - Mojo

Soundtrack
The soundtrack includes the song "While Your Lips are Still Red" by Tuomas Holopainen and Marko Hietala.

External links
 

Finnish comedy-drama films
2007 films
Films directed by Markku Pölönen